Lacken may refer to:
 Lacken, Austria
 Lacken, Belgium
 Lacken, County Mayo, Ireland
 Lacken, County Wexford, Ireland
 Lacken, County Wicklow, Ireland

See also
 Billy Lacken (1888–1916), Canadian ice hockey player